Choodalani Vundi is a 1998 Indian Telugu-language action drama film written and directed by Gunasekhar, and produced by C. Aswani Dutt under Vyjayanthi Movies. This film stars Chiranjeevi, Soundarya, Anjala Zaveri and Prakash Raj. The film has music composed by Mani Sharma with cinematography by Chota K. Naidu.

Released on 27 August 1998, the film was a success at the box office and became the highest grossing Telugu film of 1998. The film was featured in the Indian Panorama mainstream section at the 30th International Film Festival of India. It received two South Filmfare Awards and three state Nandi Awards. In 2003, it was remade into Hindi as Calcutta Mail.

Plot
Ramakrishna (Chiranjeevi) is a mechanic in Vijayawada whose life changes when he meets Priya (Anjala Zaveri) at a train station. She sees him and feels some inexplicable connection, and then runs away with him to flee her father Mahendra's (Prakash Raj) gangsters. They end up living in the forest with their son, but Mahendra, who is an underworld don, kidnaps her so that he can marry her off to another don's son. Ramakrishna confronts Mahendra, and in the ensuing struggle, Priya takes the bullet shot at Ramakrishna and dies. Their son loses his voice because of the shock, and Ramakrishna is imprisoned because the police have been corrupted by Mahendra, who is running a mafia state. Mahendra kidnaps the boy and takes him to Kolkata, where the story started. Ramakrishna, with the help of Padmavathi (Soundarya), whom he falls in love with, reunites with his son, and kills Mahendra.

Cast

 Chiranjeevi as Ramakrishna
 Soundarya as Padmavathi
 Anjala Zaveri as Priya
 Prakash Raj as Mahendra
 Brahmanandam as House Owner
 Dhulipala as Mahendra's father
 Brahmaji as Surya (Mahendra's assistant)
 Venu Madhav
 Sajja Teja as Ramakrishna's son

Soundtrack
The soundtrack and score were Composed by Mani Sharma. The film's single, Yamaha Nagari written by Veturi with the vocals of Hariharan, is a rendition of Patnam Subramania Iyer's carnatic music composition Raghuvamsa Sudha. The song depicts the culture and beauty of the city of Kolkata.

Reception 
Giddaluri Gopalrao of Zamin Ryot gave a positive review for the film. He praised Chiranjeevi for picking up a new theme and Gunasekhar for executing it. Christopher Domingo of Full Hyderabad opined that "Choodalani Vundi is an entertaining masala movie that is worth watching".

The film became a commercial success and had a theatrical run of 100 days. The film was dubbed into Tamil language under the title Calcutta.

Awards 
Filmfare Awards
 Filmfare Award for Best Music Director – Telugu   Mani Sharma
 Filmfare Award for Best Art Director – South   Thota Tharani

Nandi Awards
 Best Music Director   Mani Sharma
 Best Audiographer  Madhu Sudhan
 Best Choreographer   Saroj Khan

References

External links
 

1990s Telugu-language films
1998 films
Indian romantic drama films
Films directed by Gunasekhar
Films set in Kolkata
Telugu films remade in other languages
Films about kidnapping
Indian action thriller films
Films scored by Mani Sharma
Films shot in Kolkata
1998 action thriller films
1998 romantic drama films